Magarnat, also rendered as Magarnad and Mogernad, may refer to:
 Magarnat 1
 Magarnat 2
 Magarnat 3